Moortown is a ward in the metropolitan borough of the City of Leeds, West Yorkshire, England.  It contains 36 listed buildings that are recorded in the National Heritage List for England.  All the listed buildings are designated at Grade II, the lowest of the three grades, which is applied to "buildings of national importance and special interest".  The ward is to the north of the centre of Leeds, and contains the suburb of Moortown, the former village of Meanwood, and part of Moor Allerton.  Most of the listed buildings are houses, cottages, and associated structures.  The other listed buildings include a column, a well cover, former mill buildings, a church and a chapel and associated structures, a boundary stone, schools, and a war memorial.


Buildings

References

Citations

Sources

 

Lists of listed buildings in West Yorkshire